The 2014 Big 12 Conference baseball tournament was held from May 21 through 25 at Chickasaw Bricktown Ballpark in Oklahoma City.  The annual tournament determined the conference champion of the Division I Big 12 Conference for college baseball.  TCU won the tournament for the first time, earning the league's automatic bid to the 2014 NCAA Division I baseball tournament.

The tournament has been held since 1997, the inaugural year of the Big 12 Conference.  Among current league members, Texas has won the most championships with four.  Among original members, Baylor and Kansas State have never won the event.  Iowa State discontinued their program after the 2001 season without having won a title.  West Virginia, a new member of the league in 2013, had also have yet to win the Tournament, as of 2014.

Format and seeding
The top eight finishers from the regular season were seeded one through eight, and then played a two-bracket double-elimination tournament leading to a winner-take-all championship game.

Results

All-Tournament Team
The following players were named to the All-Tournament Team.

Most Outstanding Player
TCU designated hitter Jerrick Suiter, one of the Horned Frogs' six all-tournament selections, was named Most Outstanding Player.

References

Tournament
Big 12 Conference Baseball Tournament
Big 12 Conference baseball tournament
Big 12 Conference baseball tournament
Baseball competitions in Oklahoma City
College sports tournaments in Oklahoma